Miranga is a rural district of the municipality of Pojuca, Bahia State, Brazil. It is located 74 km northwest of the state capital Salvador, Bahia, and 22 km north of Pojuca city center.

Economy
In the 1960s, Miranga area became one of the major oil prospection regions in Brazil, leading to the establishment of large facilities of Petrobras (the Brazilian state-owned sole oil explorer), including several rigs, office buildings and dormitories. The oil production entered decline in the 1980s, leading to a partial economic breakdown.

In the 1990s Miranga experienced a certain renaissance, when local politician Antonio 'Biriba' was elected Pojuca city representative. At the same time, a few young Brazilian entrepreneurs moved into the area and invested in rural property. They also adopted modern technology for dairy production and professional strategies for human resource management, which resulted in the marked improvement of the standards of living and overall social welfare.

Miranga now has a semi-urban area, on a hill nearby the entrance of the 'farm corridor'. It has several stores, bars, two restaurants, a hostel and a catholic church on the top, dedicated to Saint Anthony of Padua.

Population
Its permanent population is estimated in about 1400, living almost exclusively from agriculture and commerce of agricultural products.

Culture
Possibly due to its high degree of African ancestry, Miranga's people are very open and friendly, with a notable talent for music and dance. Almost every night there is a party somewhere (locally known as 'seresta'), with folk guitar and drum players, dance and even amplified guitars and keyboards. Miranga preserves many aspects of the traditional Brazilian culture that were lost in the big and medium cities. For example, polygamy is largely tolerated (however not legal), and many important business contracts are sealed with no more than a hug and a handshake.

Religion
Almost all permanent residents claim to be Roman Catholic, but rituals of African 'pagan' religions are practiced with frequence.

Ethnicity
Virtually all Miranga permanent residents are a mix of African, Brazilian Native and European. Roughly 60% of the people look African, 30% are obviously mixed and 10% look European. In the 1990s a few South-Brazilian entrepreneurs of German and Italian ancestry have bought property and moved into the area.

References

External links
 www.maplandia.com

Populated places in Bahia